Najma Parveen (born 20 December 1990) is a Pakistani sprinter. She represented Pakistan at the 2016 and 2020 Summer Olympics. As of July 2021, she is the national record holder in 200m,  400m and 400m hurdles

Career
Parveen is part of the country's elite pool of athletes.

National 
Parveen represents WAPDA in all national competitions. She broke the 200m record at the 33rd National Games in Peshawar in 2019. A month later she would break it again in Nepal.

International
She competed at the 2016 Summer Olympics in the women's 200 metres race; her time of 26.11 seconds in the heats did not qualify her for the semifinals. She competed in the same event at the 2020 Summer Olympics, finishing last in her qualifying heat, albeit with a season's best.

National records

References

External links
Profile on Pakistan Sports Board (official website)

1990 births
Living people
Pakistani female sprinters
Olympic athletes of Pakistan
Athletes (track and field) at the 2016 Summer Olympics
Athletes (track and field) at the 2018 Commonwealth Games
Commonwealth Games competitors for Pakistan
Athletes (track and field) at the 2020 Summer Olympics
Olympic female sprinters